Naresh Dadhich (born September 1, 1944) is a theoretical physicist, formerly at Inter-University Center for Astronomy and Astrophysics (IUCAA). He was also the director of IUCAA until August 31, 2009. He held the M.A. Ansari Chair in Theoretical Physics at Centre for Theoretical Physics, Jamia Millia Islamia, Delhi from 2012 to 2016.

He became the director of IUCAA in July 2003. In 2012 he was a visiting faculty member at the University of KwaZulu-Natal at Durban, South Africa  and also works with gravity research groups in Portsmouth, UK and Bilbao, Spain.

Naresh Dadhich's specialties include classical and quantum gravity and relativistic astrophysics. Along with his colleagues he has published over 100 scientific papers. He has supervised several PhD students.

References

External links
 Article Title home page
 scientific publications

1944 births
Living people
Indian theoretical physicists
20th-century Indian physicists